Towner's was a station on the Harlem Line of the New York Central Railroad (now Metro-North Railroad). It was 58 miles from Grand Central Terminal.  The station dates as far back as December 31, 1848 and was closed when the New York Central merged into Penn Central in 1968. No station structures remain at the site.

Towners Station was located off New York State Route 164 just north of a bridge that carries the former New York and New England Railroad main line (now the Metro-North Beacon Line) over the tracks. The Beacon Line had a separate station nearby.

Bibliography

References

Former New York Central Railroad stations
Former railway stations in New York (state)
Railway stations in Putnam County, New York
Railway stations in the United States opened in 1848
Transportation in Putnam County, New York